Fanatics (Korean: 파나틱스; stylized as FANATICS) is a seven-member South Korean girl group formed by FENT in 2018.

History

Pre-debut
Chaelin was a contestant of Produce 101 Season 1 as a trainee of Midas Entertainment, where she finished in 87th place. Doah was a contestant on Produce 48, where she finished in 23rd place.

2018: Sub-unit Flavor
The group was originally introduced as a three-member sub-unit called Fanatics–Flavor (파나틱스-플레이버), consisting of Chiayi, Yoonhye and Doah. The sub-unit debuted on November 26, 2018 with the single "Milkshake".

2019: Full group debut with The Six
On August 6, 2019, the group made their debut with the release of their debut EP The Six, with the title track "Sunday".

2020: 2 new members and Plus Two
On May 4, 2020, the group made their comeback with their second EP Plus Two, with the title track "Vavi Girl". The comeback involved 2 new members, Via and Rayeon, while current members Chaelin and Yoonhye were not involved.

2021: Starry Night, Girls Planet 999 participation, and Sika's departure
On May 10, 2021, the group released the digital single "Starry Night".

Chiayi, Rayeon and Doah have been confirmed to take part in the upcoming Mnet survival show Girls Planet 999, which aired from August 6. Rayeon was eliminated in episode 5, finishing in 23rd place in K-Group. This was later followed by Doah and Chiayi in episode 8, who finished in 10th place in K-Group and 16th place in C-Group, respectively.

On September 24, Sika announced her departure from the group.

Members

Current Members
 Doi
 Chaelin
 Chiayi
 Via
 Yoonhye
 Rayeon
 Doah

Past Members
 Sika

Sub-units
 Flavor – Chiayi, Yoonhye, Doah

Discography

Extended plays

Single albums

Singles

Videography

References

K-pop music groups
South Korean girl groups
South Korean dance music groups
Musical groups from Seoul
Musical groups established in 2018
2018 establishments in South Korea
South Korean pop music groups